Fillemon Elifas Shuumbwa (October 10, 1932 – August 16, 1975) was the chief of Ondonga and chief minister of Ovamboland (1972–75). The Ondonga tribal area is situated around Namutoni on the eastern edge of Etosha pan in today's northern Namibia. He was assassinated in 1975 at Onamagongwa and buried in Olikondo.

References

Namibian chiefs
History of Namibia
Ovambo